Hassan Kamel Al-Sabbah (August 16, 1894March 31, 1935) was a Lebanese electrical and electronics research engineer, mathematician and inventor. He was born in Nabatieh, Lebanon.

Biography
He studied at the American University of Beirut. In 1916, he was conscripted into the Ottoman army, and worked as a telegraph operator. He later taught mathematics in Damascus, Syria, and at the American University of Beirut.

In 1921, he travelled to the United States and for a short time studied at the Massachusetts Institute of Technology before joining the University of Illinois in 1923. He joined  the vacuum tube department of the Engineering Laboratory of the General Electric Company at Schenectady, New York, in 1923, where he had engaged in mathematical and experimental research, principally on rectifiers and inverters. He received 43 patents covering his work. Among the patents were reported innovations in television transmission.

He died in an automobile accident at Lewis near Elizabeth Town, New York. His body was buried at the Nabtieh Cemetery in his hometown Nabatieh, Lebanon.

He was the nephew of linguist and writer Sheikh Ahmad Rida.

Notes 

1890s births
1935 deaths
People from Nabatieh
Lebanese Shia Muslims
American Shia Muslims
American University of Beirut alumni
Academic staff of the American University of Beirut
Lebanese emigrants to the United States
University of Illinois Urbana-Champaign faculty
Lebanese inventors
20th-century inventors
Ottoman Army personnel